Maldives made its debut in the ABU Radio Song Festival at the 2015 edition. The Maldivian broadcaster, Public Service Media, is the organiser of the Maldivian entry since the country's debut in the 2015 contest.

History

2016
On 27 February 2016 Maldives announced that they would return to the ABU Radio Song Festival, it was also announced that Bathool Ahmed would be the singer in the festival with the song "Unikan".

Participation overview 
Table key

See also
Maldives in the ABU TV Song Festival

References 

Countries at the ABU Song Festival